S. B. Jain Institute of Technology, Management and Research (SBJITMR) an autonomous institute, formerly known as S B Jain College of Engineering, is a college in Nagpur, India. It was established in 2008 by the Shantilal Badjate Charitable Trust. The institute is sanctioned by AICTE in New Delhi, DTE in Mumbai, and is partnered to Nagpur University.

History
The institution was established  by the Shantilal Badjate Charitable Trust, an initiative of Shri Shantilalji Badjate, who devoted his life to education.

In February 2018, the Institute held the annual event "Technostav", which ran for three days and which was organized by the "Student Representative Council". The 2019 edition of the event was also held and ran from 23 to 25 January 2019, and this was also supported by the "Central  Team".

In March 2021, the University Grants Commission and Rashtrasant Tukadoji Maharaj Nagpur University granted autonomous status to the Institute for 10 years from the 2020-2021 academic session.

Campus
The institute is situated on a  campus that was designed with a British architectural pattern.

Departments
 Electrical Engineering
 Electronics and Telecommunication Engineering
 Electronics Engineering
 Computer Science and Engineering
 Emerging Technologies
 Mechanical Engineering
 Business Administration (MBA)
 Electronics Engineering (M.Tech)

Admission
 Passing the HSSC or its equivalent exam with Physics, Chemistry/Biotechnology/Biology/Technical Vocational subject & Mathematics as subjects is a prerequisite.
 Candidates shall also have appeared in JEE (Mains) in that particular academic year.

Student life

Scholarships
SB Jain Institute offers merit-based scholarships a needs-based scholarship named the "late Mrs. Jaswantiben Anantrai Parekh need based scholarship", under the aegis of the Sir Shantilal Badjate Charitable Trust Nagpur, for students belonging to economically weaker families.

College fest
Technotsav is a national level technical event with participation from many reputed engineering colleges of India. It has various events including technical paper presentations, line tracer robots, RoboWars, LAN gaming and sports activities. Eminent speakers like Shri. Nitinji Gadkari, Transport minister under the BJP central cabinet and Shri Devendra Fadnavis, Chief Minister of Maharashtra have spoken at this event.

Student associations
 Students Representative Council (SRC)
 IEEE Student Branch
 Department of Training & Placement
 SuiGeneris (Departmental Forum of CSE Department)
 ELAN (Departmental Forum of Electrical Department)
 FEETA (Departmental Forum of ETC-ETRX Department)
 AIMES (Departmental Forum of Mechanical Department)

Training & Placement Department is the most crucial part which plays an important role in providing opportunities to the student by arranging Campus Interviews. In SBJITMR, the Training & Placement is highly supported by its teaching faculty of various departments.

The placement policies and other related activities are handled by T & P Officer in consultation with the Principal and the college management.

Recognition 
In June 2021, Zee Digital recognized the Institute in the Edufuture Excellence Awards as an "Outstanding Business School (West)".

References

External links
 

Engineering colleges in Nagpur
Rashtrasant Tukadoji Maharaj Nagpur University
Educational institutions established in 2008
2008 establishments in Maharashtra